Brigadier General George Allan Dodd (July 26, 1852 – June 28, 1925) was an officer in the United States Army. He was known for his victory over the Villistas in 1916 at the Battle of Guerrero, Mexico, during the Pancho Villa Expedition.

Early life and family
Dodd was born in Lycoming County, Pennsylvania on July 26, 1852. Dodd's father was killed in the American Civil War in 1865, at the Siege of Petersburg, so he helped raise his younger brothers and sisters with his mother.

Early career
In 1872, Dodd passed the entrance exam at West Point and passed so he was accepted into the United States Military Academy and graduated on June 15, 1876. Immediately following this he joined the 3rd Cavalry and was sent to Dakota Territory to fight in the Great Sioux War against various native American tribes of the Northern Plains. During the war, Dodd led Sioux scouts and fought in the Battle of Bates Creek, in which the Cheyenne leader Dull Knife was killed.

In 1880, he married Clara Agnes Steele. They had nine children: Emily, Catherine, Allen, Charles, George Allen, Mary Ethel, William Alexander, Reginald Alden, and Lida Dorothy.

In 1882, in Geronimo's War, Dodd commanded Apache scouts in the American Southwest and northern Mexico. It was at this time that he fought in the Battle of Big Dry Wash on July 17, 1882, the last major battle involving the Apache.

Spanish–American War
When the Spanish–American War began on April 25, 1898, Dodd was still serving in the 3rd Cavalry when he received orders to sail from Florida to Cuba with a large American invasion force in order to capture the island from its Spanish garrison. At the Battle of San Juan Hill on July 1, Dodd distinguished himself while fighting alongside Theodore Roosevelt and his Rough Riders. He was also wounded in the Siege of Santiago from July 3 through July 17 while serving as a captain. When the war ended, Dodd returned to the United States for a brief time and was promoted to major.

Philippine insurrection
In 1899, the Filipino Rebellion began so that year the 3rd Cavalry sailed for Manila.

For the next few years, until 1902, Dodd and the 3rd Cavalry remained on duty mainly in the Philippines, occasionally returning to America. In 1904 he was promoted to lieutenant colonel and placed second in command of the 10th Cavalry Buffalo Soldiers.

Mexican punitive expedition
In 1916, at age sixty-three, Dodd was the colonel of approximately 400 men of the 7th Cavalry, stationed at Camp Harvey J. Jones, Arizona. Following Pancho Villa's attack on Columbus, New Mexico in March, Dodd and his command were ordered to ride south into Chihuahua, Mexico to participate in General John J. Pershing's punitive expedition. On March 29, Dodd arrived at the town of Guerrero, which was held by hundreds of Villistas, led by Villa himself. In what was called the "last true cavalry charge" in history, the 7th Cavalry attacked Guerrero and routed the Mexicans after five hours of fighting. Fifty-six of Villa's men, including one of his generals, were killed in the fighting, and another thirty-five were wounded. On the American side, only five men were wounded but the victory was not complete as Villa escaped capture with the majority of his men. However, over the next few months, the Villistas remained dispersed in the hills of the Sierra Madre and were no longer consider a threat to the United States Army.

News of the battle quickly spread to the United States, where Dodd was acclaimed a national hero. Soon thereafter, the Senate approved his promotion to brigadier general. Although Dodd was promoted on July 3, 1916, he retired from the Army only 13 days later on July 26<--26 - 3 = 23, not 13-->, having reached the mandatory retirement age of 64.

Personal life and family
In retirement, Dodd lived on his farm near Ithaca, New York. He later moved to a home in Orlando, Florida, where he died on June 28, 1925. General Dodd was buried with his wife and one son at Arlington National Cemetery.

Dodd's grandson Alfred Dodd Starbird was a penathlete in the 1936 Summer Olympics and lieutenant general in the Army. Great-great-granddaughter Kate Starbird was a professional basketball player before becoming a computer scientist.

Awards
 Silver Star with three oak leaf clusters
 Indian Campaign Medal
 Spanish Campaign Medal
 Philippine Campaign Medal
 Mexican Service Medal

External links
 Entry in Cullum's Register

References

Bibliography 
 
 
 

1852 births
1925 deaths
Burials at Arlington National Cemetery
Apache Wars
People of the Mexican Revolution
American military personnel of the Spanish–American War
American military personnel of the Philippine–American War
American military personnel of the Indian Wars
United States Army generals